Volodymyr Illich Paniotto (born in Kyiv on January 22, 1947) is a Ukrainian sociologist, doctor of philosophical sciences, Director General of the Kyiv International Institute of Sociology (KIIS), and professor at the Sociology Department of Kyiv-Mohyla Academy.

Career 
After his graduation in 1970 from the Faculty of Mechanics and Mathematics of the Taras Shevchenko National University of Kyiv, he worked at the Philosophy Institute of the Academy of Sciences of the Ukrainian Soviet Socialist Republic as a researcher and eventually as a chair of the Sector for Computer Modeling of Social Processes. In 1990 and 1991, he chaired the Department for Methodology and Methods in Sociology at the Sociology Institute of the National Academy of Sciences of Ukraine. In 1991 and 1992, he was a professor at the Taras Shevchenko National University of Kyiv. Since 1992, he has been the Director of the Kyiv International Institute of Sociology, which he co-founded together with Valeriy Khmelko and Michael Swafford. Since 1992, he has also been a professor at the Sociology Department of Kyiv-Mohyla Academy. He has participated in professional development programs at Columbia University and Munich University. During two semesters (in 1993 and 1995), he was a visiting professor at Johns Hopkins University.

Volodymyr Paniotto is a member of the Directing Council of the Sociological Association of Ukraine. 1996 to 2005, he was the national representative of the European Society for Opinion and Marketing Research (ESOMAR). He is also a member of the World Association for Public Opinion Research (WAPOR), the American Association for Public Opinion Research (AAPOR), and the International Sociological Association (ISA). From 2006, he has been the Vice-President of the Ukrainian Marketing Association (UMA). Prof. Paniotto is one of the two Ukrainian sociologists (the other one being Evgeniy Golovakha) included into the 2002 edition of "Who is Who in the World".

Volodymyr Paniotto serves on editorial boards of a number of Ukrainian and Russian professional journals: "Sociology: Theory, Methods, Marketing", "Marketing Research", "Statistics of Ukraine", "4M: Methodology, Methods, Mathematical Modeling in Sociology". He is well known for his expertise in social science research methods. Besides methodological issues, including sociometric data analysis and exit polls, he also published research on poverty, occupational prestige, and xenophobia. Overall, Prof. Paniotto has published 10 books and over 200 articles and chapters (see Володимир Ілліч Паніотто. Бібліографічній покажчик. Серія "Вчені НаУКМА" випуск 17. – ВД "Академія", 2007. – 73 с.).   The book "Why a Sociologist Needs Mathematics", co-authored with Valentyn Maksymenko, won the second prize at the general Soviet Union contest of about 400 publications (see Марина Марківна Попова: Memoria / сост.: М. Б. Кунявській, Є. В. Лисенко, О. Р. Личковська. - Одеса: Астропринт, 2011. – С. 414.)

Selected publications
Books
 1.  Статистический анализ социологических данных.  Kиев: Издательский Дом "KM Академия", 2004. – 270 p. (в соавторстве с В.Максименко и Н.Харченко). На украинском языке.
 2. Опыт моделирования социальных процессов. Под ред.  В.Паніотто. -  Київ: Наукова думка, 200 с., 1989
 3. Почтовый опрос в социологическом исследовании. В соавт. с Ю.Яковенко.-   Киев: Наукова думка, 138 с., 1988
 4. Качество социологической информации. -  Киев: Наукова думка,   206 с., 1986
 5. Количественные методы в социологических исследованиях. В соавт. с В. Максименко -  Киев:  Наукова думка, 272 с.,1982
 6.  Структура межличностных отношений.  Kиев:  Наукова думка, 128 с., 1975

Articles
 Ukrainian  movement for perestroika  ("Rukh"): results of a sociological survey. – Soviet  Studies, Vol.43,  No.1, Glasgow, 1991.
 Social Structure and Personality under Conditions  of  Radical Social Change: A Comparative  Analysis  of  Poland  and Ukraine.  – American Sociological Review, 1997, August, Vol. 62, N.4  (with M.Kohn and others).
 V. Paniotto. The level of anti-semitism in Ukraine. – International Journal of Sociology. Fall 1999, vol.29, No.3. – P.66–75.
 N. Kharchenko, V. Paniotto. Poverty profiles and coping mechanisms in Ukraine. – Poverty in Transition Economies. Ed. by S.Hutton and G.Redmond. Routledge, London-N.Y.,  2000. – P. 91–109.
 В. Паніотто, Н. Харченко. Социологические исследования как способ контроля результатов выборов и референдумов // Социология: теория, методы, маркетинг. – 2001. – №1. – С. 155–170.
 Паніотто В.І., Хмелько В.Є. Динаміка ставлення населення до незалежності України та фактори, що ії визначають. – Десять років соціально-економічних перетворень в Україні: спроба неупередженої оцінки / Ред. І. Бураковський. – Київ: "К.І.С.", 2002. – C. 23–28.
 Paniotto V., Shiraev E. Ukraine: Fears and Uncertainty. -  Fears in Pos-Communist Societies. A Comarative Perspective. Ed. by V.Shlapentokh and E.Shiraev. – N.Y.: Palgrave,  2002. – P. 67–80.
 В. Мітофскі, М. Едельман, В. Паніотто, Н. Харченко. Опитування "екзит пол": історія, розвиток, методологія. – Загальнонаціональні опитування exit poll.  – К.: Заповіт, 2002. – C. 9–17.
 M. Kohn, V. Paniotto, K. Slomczynsky and others. Structural Location and Personality During the Transformation of Poland and Ukraine // Social Psychology Quarterly, vol.65, No.4,  December 2002. – P. 364–386.
 M. Kohn, V. Khmelko, V. Paniotto, Ho-Fung Hung.  Social structure and personality During the process of Radical Social change: A Study of Ukraine in Transition.  – Comparative Sociology, 2004, vol.3, issue 3-4.
 V. Paniotto.  Presidential Elections 2004 and the Orange Revolution. –  Election Time, Vienna, 2005.
 O. Bekh, E. Murrugarra, V. Paniotto, T. Petrenko, V. Sarioglo. Ukraine School Survey (Design Challenges, Poverty Links, and Evaluation Opportunities). – Are You Being Served? New Tools for Measuring Service Delivery. Ed.by S.Amin,J.Das, M.Goldstein. – The World Bank. – Washington, 2008. – C. 251–270.
 В. Паніотто.  Динаміка ксенофобії і антисемітизму в Україні (1994–2007) – Соціологія: теорія, методи, маркетинг. 2008, N.1. – C. 197–214.
 S.J.Bromet, S.F.Gluzman, N.L.Tintle, V.I.Paniotto, C.P.M.Webb, V.Zakhozha, J.M.Havenaar, Z.Gutkovich, S.Kostyuchenko and J.E.Schwartz.  The State of Mental Health and Alcoholism in Ukraine. – The WHO World Mental Health Surveys.  Global Perspectives on the Epidemiology of Mental Disorders/ Ed.by R.C.Kessler,  N.B.Ŭstün.  Cambridge University Press, 2008. – P. 431–447.
 V. Paniotto, N. Kharchenko. What Poverty Criteria Are Best for Ukraine? – Problems of Economic Transition, vol.51, no. 7, November 2008. – P. 5–12.
 N. Kharchenko and V. Paniotto. Exit Polling in an Emergent Democracy: The Complex Case of Ukraine. Survey Research Methods (2010), Vol.4, No.1. – P. 31–42.
V.Paniotto, N.Kharchenko.  Metodyka i tekhnolohiia provedennia Natsionalnoho ekzyt-polu 2010. – K.: Fond «Demokratychni initsiatyvy» im.I.Kucheriva, 2011. S. 17-32
V.Paniotto.  Ihor Semenovych Kon: foto komentar, lystuvannia. Sotsiolohiia: teoriia, metody, marketynh. 2011, N.2, c. 3-9
Paniotto V.I., Kharchenko N.M. Hlava 32. Metodychni osoblyvosti provedennia ekzyt-poliv. – Sotsiolohiia polityky: pidruchnyk u 2-kh chastynakh.  Za red. V.A.Poltoraka, O.V.Petrova, A.V.Tolstoukhova – K.: Vydavnytstvo Yevropeiskoho un-tu, 2011, t.2, chastyna 2, s.283 – 301.  
R.Lenchovskyi, V.Panyotto, V.Khmelko. K soedynenyiu smыslov y chysel v otobrazhenyy sotsyalnoi realnosty (yz opыta poyska putei). – Sotsiolohichna kultura: chysla i smysly. Materialy Mizhnarodnykh sotsiolohichnykh chytan pam»iati N.V.Paninoi. – K.: Instytut sotsiolohii NANU, 2011. – 172 s.  s.25-54
V.Panyotto, N.Kharchenko. Kryzys v metodakh oprosa y puty eho preodolenyia. –
o	Sotsyolohyia: teoryia, metodы, marketynh, 2012, N.1, c. 3-20
V.Panyotto. «Kryzys v metodakh oprosa y puty eho preodolenyia»: soobrazhenyia po teme mezhdunarodnoi konferentsyy. – Vestnyk obshchestvennoho mnenyia.  Dannыe. Analyz. Dyskussyy. 2012, N 4(110), s.113
V.Panyotto, N.Kharchenko. Kryzys v metodakh oprosa y puty eho preodolenyia. –
Vestnyk obshchestvennoho mnenyia.  Dannыe. Analyz. Dyskussyy. 2012, N 1(111), s.100-108
V.Paniotto, A.Hrushetskyi.  Chy shche ne vmerlo modeliuvannia?  Istoriia sotsialnoho modeliuvannia v Ukraini ta ahentno-oriientovanyi pidkhid na prykladi prohnozuvannia movnoi sytuatsii v Ukraini. – Suchasni metody zboru i analizu danykh v sotsiolohii / Za naukovoiu red. Ye.I.Holovakhy i T.Ia.Liubyvoi. – K.: Instytut sotsiolohii NAN Ukrainy, 2013. – 140s.
V. Panyotto.  Ukrayna. Evromaidan. Vestnyk obshchestvennoho mnenyia.  Dannыe. Analyz. Dyskussyy. 2013, N 3-4(116),        s.3-16
V.Paniotto. Amosov i modeliuvannia sotsialnykh protsesiv. - Sotsiolohiia: teoriia, metody, marketynh, 2014, N.1, c. 199-206
A.Mazurok, V.Panyotto, N.Kharchenko. Faktorы эlektoralnoi populiarnosty VO «Svoboda». – Sotsyolohyia: teoryia, metodы, marketynh, 2014, N.2, c. 82-100
V.Paniotto. Euromaidan: Profile of a Rebellion. - Global Dialogue, 2014, Volume 4, Issue 2
V.Panyotto. Evromaidan. Do y posle pobedы. Vestnyk obshchestvennoho mnenyia.  Dannыe. Analyz. Dyskussyy. 2014, N 1-2(117),        s.135-140
V.Panyotto. Evromaidan vnutry y snaruzhy: rezultatы sotsyolohycheskykh yssledovanyi. - – K.: Instytut sotsiolohii NAN Ukrainy, 2015. –  s.15-33  164s.
V. Panyotto, V. Khmelko. Vstrechy s Yadovыm. - Sotsiolohichni chytannia pamiati Natalii Paninoi i Volodymyra Yadova. Vystupy ta ese / Za nauk. red. Ye.I. Holovakhy ta O.H. Stehniia. — K.: Instytut sotsiolohii NAN Ukrainy, 2016. — s.114.
V.Panyotto, N.Kharchenko. Stratehyia yssledovanyia. - Marketynh v Ukraini, 2016, N1-2, s.41-57
V.Paniotto. Chynnyky shchastia i sotsialna napruzhenist. – Problemy rozvytku sotsiolohichnoi teorii: strukturni zminy i sotsialna napruzhenist. Materialy IV Mizhnarod. Nauk.-prakt. Konferentsii. – K.: Lohos, 2017
V.Paniotto.  Metody opytuvan v Ukraini: istoriia ta suchasni problemy. – Metodolohiia i metody sotsiolohichnykh doslidzhen v Ukraini: istoriia i suchasni problemy.  Do 70-richchia Volodymyra Paniotto: zbirnyk statei za materialamy konferentsii, 22 sichnia, m.Kyiv. – Kyiv: Instytut sotsiolohii NAN Ukrainy, KhNU imeni V.N.Karazina, 2017. – 208 s., s.12-27
V.Paniotto. Formuvannia natsionalnoi vybirky za umov aneksii Krymu i okupatsii chastyny Donbasu. – Novi nerivnosti – novi konflikty: shliakhy podolannia. Tretii konhres Sotsiolohichnoi asotsiatsii Ukrainy.  Tezy dopovidei. – Kharkiv: SAU, KhNU imeni V.N.Karazina, 2017. – s.22
V.Panyotto. Ystoryia vыborochnыkh yssledovanyi v Ukrayne: opыt sotrudnychestva s Nykolaem Churylovыm y Lesly Kyshem. – Ukrainske suspilstvo: shcho my znaiemo, choho ne znaiemo i choho unykaiemo? Materialy Mizhnarodnykh sotsiolohichnykh chytan pamiati N.V.Paninoi. – Kyiv: Instytut sotsiolohii NAN Ukrainy, 2017. – 152 s., s.51-61
V.Paniotto. Metody i dosvid doslidzhennia parlamentu Ukrainy. - SOMA ShchORIChNA MIZhNARODNA KONFERENTsIIa «PARLAMENTSKI ChYTANNIa». – Kyiv, Laboratoriia zakonodavchykh initsiatyv, 2017. – 110s., s. 5-11.
V. Paniotto, Yu. Sakhno, A. Piaskovska. Dynamika rivnia shchastia ta yoho determinanty. Ukraina 2001 – 2017. -  Sotsiolohiia: teoriia, metody, marketynh, 2018, N1- S.84-101
N.Kharchenko, V.Paniotto, O. Perverzyev. Up-to-date view on the crisis in survey methods and ways to overcome. – Ukrainian Sociology in the 21st Century. Theory, Methods. Research results. Ed by V.Bakirov, Y.Golovakha. -  Kharkiv: Instytut sotsiolohii NAN Ukrainy, KhNU imeni V.N.Karazina, SAU, 2018. – 559p. p.173-190
 V.Panyotto. Anekdotы o marketynhe y reklame. Chast 1. - Marketynh v Ukraini, 1918, N6  
V.Paniotto. Dovira naselennia Ukrainy do sotsiolohichnykh opytuvan (2002-2018) - Marketynh v Ukraini, 2019, N1, s.4-11 
V.Panyotto. Anekdotы o marketynhe y reklame. Chast 2. - Marketynh v Ukraini, 2019, N4, s.66-70
V.Paniotto. Rozvytok metodiv sotsiolohichnykh doslidzhen v Instytuti filosofii AN URSR (1968-1990rr). – Akademichna sotsiolohiia v Ukraini (1918-2018). U 2-kh tomakh. Tom 2. Spohady, interviu, statti. – Kyiv: Instytut sotsiolohii NAN Ukrainy, 2019. – 345 s. , s.45-54
V.Paniotto. Maibutnie metodiv sotsiolohichnykh doslidzhen.- Sotsiolohiia maibutnoho i maibutnie sotsiolohii v KhKh1 stolitti. – Kyiv: Instytut sotsiolohii NAN Ukrainy, 2019. – 128 s., s.49-65
V.Panyotto. Anekdotы o marketynhe y reklame. Chast 3. - Marketynh v Ukraini, 2019, N6, s.63-68
Paniotto V.I.  The attitude of Ukraines population to Russia and Russias population to Ukraine (2008–2020).  -  Naukovi zapysky NaUKMA.  Tom 3. Sotsiolohichni nauky. – 2020, s.3-14

References

1947 births
Ukrainian sociologists
Living people